Mullen is a surname.

Mullen may also refer to:

Mullen, California
Mullen, Nebraska
Mullen Township, Boyd County, Nebraska
alternate spelling for mullein, a medicinal herb
Mullen Advertising, an advertising firm based in Boston, Mass.
Mullen Technologies, an electric vehicle manufacturer based in Brea, California.

See also
Mullen High School
Mullens, West Virginia
Mullins (surname)
Moylan
Maelan mac Cathmogha
Mac Maoláin